"Beach House" is a song by The Chainsmokers. It was released as a single on November 16, 2018, via Disruptor Records and Columbia Records. It is included on their second studio album, Sick Boy. It is also notably the only song on the album to not feature any other musicians in the song credits.

Background 
Jillian Mapes of Pitchfork wrote that "though the accompanying lyric video doesn’t even capitalize Beach House...They are talking about the Baltimore duo that, for the last decade or so, has redefined the concept of 'vibey' music by honing a specific sound and not striving for mass appeal." She said "music for space travel, but it's also the kind of thing that's playing when you're passing a joint and one of your friends asks what chakras even are".

The Chainsmokers stated about the song on Twitter that they "really love this song as well cause we tried to get back to our roots on this with that classic OG Chainsmoker feel. And we were listening to a lot of beach house", noting the song was inspired by the indie rock duo Beach House.

Lyric video 
"Beach House"'s lyric video, directed and edited by Jeremiah Davis and produced by That One Blond Kid Corp, was released to YouTube on November 16, 2018. It features the Chainsmokers member Drew Taggart singing the song intercut with footage of different women.

Critical reception 
Spin described the song's meaning as "feeling horny and needy that sounds sort of unfinished," noting the "big synth line, a trip to Japan, possible recreational drugs, and muted acoustic guitar chords standing in for emotion." Kat Bein of Billboard stated that the song is a "a love song, not about any one girl in particular, but a certain type of girl that keeps singer Drew Taggart from feeling too lonely on the road." She also said it consists of a "simple synth hook and pop song-structure that's worked so well in the past." Dancing Astronaut called the song a "reminiscent of the pop-dance fusion releases that ascended Pall and Taggart into rampant stardom with Memories...Do Not Open".

Charts

Weekly charts

Year-end charts

Notes

References 

2018 songs
2018 singles
The Chainsmokers songs
Disruptor Records singles
Songs written by Andrew Taggart
Songs written by Alex Pall
Songs about beaches
Future bass songs